Thiagarajar Polytechnic College, Alagappanagar is a Government-owned aided Vocational Education Institution in Thrissur district. The college was started by the great Educationalist and philanthropist, Dr. Alagappa Chettiar, who has started many educational institutions in Tamilnadu and Kerala. It was sanctioned by Pandit Jawaharlal Nehru, the first Prime Minister of India in 1956 and was the first aided polytechnic institution in India.  The institution is now under the Patron ship of archdiocese of thrissur. It is functioning under the Department of Technical Education of the Government of Kerala

History of College 
 Started in 1956
 It started with 30 students of Civil Diploma Engineering branch.
 In 1961 K. Thyagarajan Chettiar Madurai took over. Principal - Mr.K Menon.
 1971 Principal - Shri N. Bhavendranathan
 The function was taken over by the Archbishop of Thrissur in the year 1980-81. Principal - Shri. Francis C Joseph and Chairman of Government Council Shri. Rev. Rev. Fr. Joseph Kakkassery
 Smt.MD Devayani was principal in 1996-1999. Chairman of Government Council Shri. Rev. Fr. Lawrence Ollankal.
 In 2000 Principal Shri. KK Sahadevan took charge.
 Principal from 2004 onwards is Smt.Anna Terji.
 In 2016 college celebrated 60 years after established. Inaugurated by E. Sreedharan

Courses

Full time Courses (Duration 3 years) 
 Diploma Mechanical Engineering
 Diploma Electrical Engineering
 Diploma Civil Engineering

Short Term Courses (Duration 6 months) 
 Computer

References

External links 

Official College Website
 Wikimapia college

Engineering colleges in Thrissur district
1956 establishments in Kerala
Educational institutions established in 1956